Edward F. Burns Jr. (January 28, 1931 – January 10, 2019) was a Republican member of the Pennsylvania House of Representatives.

References

Republican Party members of the Pennsylvania House of Representatives
1931 births
2019 deaths